Carlos Blackaller Ayala (born 3 March 1963) is a Mexican politician affiliated with the Institutional Revolutionary Party. As of 2014 he served as Deputy of the LIX Legislature of the Mexican Congress as a plurinominal representative.

References

1963 births
Living people
Politicians from Guadalajara, Jalisco
Members of the Chamber of Deputies (Mexico)
Institutional Revolutionary Party politicians
21st-century Mexican politicians
Panamerican University alumni
Deputies of the LIX Legislature of Mexico